Sheldonia fuscicolor, common name the montane tail-wagger snail, is a species of air-breathing land snail, a terrestrial gastropod mollusk in the family Urocyclidae.

The distribution of this species includes South Africa.

References

Urocyclidae
Gastropods described in 1892